Həsənli (also, Gasanli) is a village and municipality in the Tovuz Rayon of Azerbaijan.  It has a population of 988.  The municipality consists of the villages of Həsənli and Məşədivəlilər.

References 

Populated places in Tovuz District